Mother's Child is a 1916 American silent comedy film featuring Oliver Hardy.

Cast
 Oliver Hardy as Babe (as Babe Hardy)
 Kate Price as His mother
 Joe Cohen as Tom
 Florence McLaughlin as Florence (as Florence McLoughlin)

See also
 List of American films of 1916

External links

1916 films
1916 short films
American silent short films
American black-and-white films
1916 comedy films
Silent American comedy films
American comedy short films
Films directed by Oliver Hardy
1910s American films